On Wings of Song may refer to:

"Auf Flügeln des Gesanges", On Wings of Song (poem), 1827 poem by Heinrich Heine
"Auf Flügeln des Gesanges", On Wings of Song (Mendelssohn), 1834 song
Arrangement Franz Liszt for solo piano (S. 547)
"Auf Flügeln des Gesanges", setting of the poem by Franz Lachner.
On Wings of Song (novel), 1979 sci-fi novel by Thomas Disch

Albums
On Wings of song, album by Robert Gass 1976
On Wings of song, album by Ann Murray and Felicity Lott 1992 
On Wings of song, album by Jenny Oaks Baker 1998 
Disney's Enchanted, album by Barbara Bonney 2007
On Wings of Song: The Performance Recordings of Josephine A. Estill 1939–1974